Albert Secrétant (3 January 1906 – 5 April 1991) was a French cross-country skier. He competed in the men's 18 kilometre event at the 1932 Winter Olympics.

References

1906 births
1991 deaths
French male cross-country skiers
Olympic cross-country skiers of France
Cross-country skiers at the 1932 Winter Olympics
People from Saint-Claude, Jura
Sportspeople from Jura (department)